Michael Herzog (born 1964) is a German neuroscientist and psychophysicist. His interdisciplinary research draws on biology, neurosciences, mathematics, and philosophy with a focus on perception. Herzog is a professor for neuroscience at the School of Life Sciences at EPFL (École Polytechnique Fédérale de Lausanne) and head of the Laboratory of Psychophysics.

Career 
Herzog studied mathematics, biology and philosophy at the University of Erlangen, at the University of Tübingen, and at the Massachusetts Institute of Technology (MIT). In 1992, he received a diploma in mathematics from the University of Tübingen for his thesis on "Automorphism groups of Hamming graphs" supervised by Christoph Hering. In 1993, Herzog earned a Master's degree in philosophy from the University of Tübingen for his research with Herbert Keuth about approaches to intentionality and representation. He then joined Manfred Fahle at the University of Tübingen and Tomaso Poggio at MIT, and earned a PhD in biology for his thesis on "mathematical models and psychophysical experiments of perceptual learning".

From 1998 to 1999, he joined the laboratory of Christof Koch at California Institute of Technology as a postdoctoral fellow to investigating the characteristics of temporal processing and feature integration. In 1999, he went to work as a senior researcher with Manfred Fahle at the section of Human Neurobiology at the University of Bremen where he was project  leader at the Center of Excellence 517 on "Neurocognition" that was funded by German Research Council (DFG). In 2003 he became a professor for neurobiopsychology at the Osnabrück University for one year.

In 2004, Herzog was appointed as professor for neuroscience at the Brain Mind Institute of the School of Life Sciences at EPFL and head of the Laboratory of Psychophysics. In 2015, he was promoted as Full Professor at EPFL.

Research 

Herzog's laboratory investigates visual information processing in humans applying psychophysical methods, TMS, EEG, and mathematical modelling. Their research focuses on feature integration, contextual modulation, time course of information processing, and perceptual learning. They also perform clinical studies in schizophrenic patients and healthy older people to study visual information processing deficits.

Selected works 
 
 
 
 
 
Herzog is also the author of a text book:

References

External links 
 
 Publication listed on ORCID
 Website of the Laboratory of Psychophysics

1964 births
Living people
University of Tübingen alumni
Massachusetts Institute of Technology alumni
Academic staff of the École Polytechnique Fédérale de Lausanne